is a Japanese sprinter. He competed in the men's 4 × 400 metres relay at the 2016 Summer Olympics.

Personal best

International competition

References

External links

1995 births
Living people
Japanese male sprinters
Olympic athletes of Japan
Athletes (track and field) at the 2016 Summer Olympics
Universiade medalists in athletics (track and field)
Place of birth missing (living people)
Asian Games medalists in athletics (track and field)
Asian Games gold medalists for Japan
Medalists at the 2014 Asian Games
Athletes (track and field) at the 2014 Asian Games
Universiade silver medalists for Japan
Medalists at the 2015 Summer Universiade
20th-century Japanese people
21st-century Japanese people